Afiq bin Saluddin (born 21 June 1998) is a Malaysian professional footballer who last played for Malaysia Premier League side Kelantan as a forward.

Career statistics

Club

References

External links
 

Living people
1998 births
People from Kelantan
Malaysian people of Malay descent
Malaysian footballers
Kelantan FA players
Association football forwards
Malaysia Super League players